The Pierce and Walter Butler House is a side-by-side duplex, in the West Summit Avenue Historic District of Saint Paul, Minnesota.

Description and history 
The house was built in 1900 by Clarence H. Johnston, Sr. for United States Supreme Court justice Pierce Butler and his brother Walter Butler.

References

Houses completed in 1900
Houses in Saint Paul, Minnesota
Houses on the National Register of Historic Places in Minnesota
Individually listed contributing properties to historic districts on the National Register in Minnesota
National Register of Historic Places in Saint Paul, Minnesota
Renaissance Revival architecture in Minnesota